Lolo Soetoro (EYD: Lolo Sutoro; ; 2 January 1935 – 2 March 1987), also known as Lolo Soetoro Mangunharjo or Mangundikardjo, was an Chinese-Indonesian man who was the stepfather of Barack Obama, the 44th president of the United States.

Early life and education
Soetoro was born in Bandung, West Java, Dutch East Indies (now Indonesia), the ninth of 10 children of Soewarno Martodihardjo, an employee of a mining office from Yogyakarta. 
Soetoro earned his bachelor's degree in geography from Gadjah Mada University, in Yogyakarta.  In 1962, Soetoro, then a civilian employee of the Indonesian Army Topographic Service, obtained an East–West Center grant for graduate study in geography at the University of Hawaii at Manoa. He arrived in Honolulu in September 1962 and graduated from the university with a M.A. in geography in June 1964.

Marriage to Ann Dunham
Soetoro met the divorced Ann Dunham at the East-West Center while both were students at the University of Hawaii,  and married on 15 March 1965.  Soetoro, a geographer, returned to Indonesia in 1966 to help map Western New Guinea for the Indonesian government, while Dunham and her son Barack Obama moved into her parents' house in Honolulu to complete her studies.

Dunham and her six-year-old son joined Soetoro in Jakarta in 1967. The family initially lived for two and a half years in a modest stucco and red tile house in a newly built neighborhood in Menteng Dalam village in South Jakarta and owned a new Japanese motorcycle. Dunham worked as assistant director of the Indonesia-America Friendship Institute while Obama attended the Indonesian-language Santo Fransiskus Asisi (St. Francis of Assisi) Catholic School.

In 1970, with a new job in government relations at Union Oil Company, Soetoro moved his family two miles north to a rented house, with a car replacing their motorcycle.  Dunham was a department head and a director of the Lembaga Pendidikan dan Pengembangan Manajemen (LPPM)–the Institute of Management Education and Development.  Obama attended the Indonesian-language Besuki School.

On 15 August 1970, Soetoro and Dunham had a daughter, Maya Kasandra Soetoro.

In mid-1971, Obama moved back to Hawaii to attend Punahou School. In August 1972, Dunham rejoined Obama with her daughter and began graduate study at the University of Hawaii at Manoa. She gained an M.A. in anthropology in December 1974 and returned with her daughter to Jakarta in 1975 while Obama remained in Hawaii.  In 1976, Dunham and her daughter lived for half a year with Soetoro's 76-year-old mother.

Dunham became increasingly interested in Indonesian culture while Soetoro became more interested in that of the West, and their relationship was in conflict over differing values. They divorced on 6 November 1980.

In his 1995 memoir Dreams from My Father, Obama described Soetoro as well-mannered, even-tempered, and easy with people; he wrote of the struggles he felt Soetoro had to deal with after his return to Indonesia from Hawaii.  He described his stepfather as following "a brand of Islam that could make room for the remnants of more ancient, classical, and Dharmic philosophies such as that of the Hindu."  In a 2007 article, Chicago Tribune foreign correspondent Kim Barker reported that Soetoro "was much more of a free spirit than a devout Muslim, according to former friends and neighbors."

Later life
Soetoro married Erna Kustina in 1980 and had two children, son Yusuf Aji Soetoro (born 1981), and daughter Rahayu Nurmaida Soetoro (born 1984).

Soetoro died, age 52, on 2 March 1987, of liver failure, and was buried in Tanah Kusir Cemetery, South Jakarta.

Notes

References
 
 
 

1935 births
1987 deaths
20th-century geographers
20th-century Indonesian businesspeople
Burials in Indonesia
Deaths from liver failure
Gadjah Mada University alumni
Indonesian Muslims
Javanese people
Obama family
People from Bandung
University of Hawaiʻi at Mānoa alumni